Göviken Heliport, Östersund is the home base of Jämtlands Flyg AB helicopter company. The base is located near central Östersund city.

See also
 List of the largest airports in the Nordic countries

Heliports in Sweden
Airports in Sweden